

Main festivals

Dashain

Dashain (also Baḍādaśhãin  or Bijayā Daśamī ) is the 15-day-long festival and holidays of Nepal. It is the longest and the most auspicious festival in the Nepalese annual calendar, celebrated by Nepalese Hindu people throughout the globe. It is not only the longest festival of the country, but also the one which is most anticipated. As one of the popular countries, Nepal has its Hindu festival as Dashain. The festival falls in September or October, starting from the shukla paksha (bright lunar fortnight) of the month of Ashvin and ending on purnima, the full moon. Among the 10 days for which it is celebrated, the most important days are the first, seventh, eighth, ninth and the tenth, but tenth day is very important 
Throughout the country Shakti is worshiped in all her manifestations. This festival is also known for its emphasis on the family gatherings, as well as on a renewal of community ties. People return from all parts of the world, as well as different parts of the country, to celebrate together. All government offices, educational institutions and other private offices remain closed during the festival and holidays period.

Significance

Dashain symbolizes the victory of good over evil.

For followers of Shaktism, it represents the bare victory of the goddess, Shakti. In Hindu mythology, the demon Mahishasura had created terror in the devaloka (the world where gods live ) but Durga killed the demon. The first nine days of Dashain symbolizes the battle which took place between the different manifestations of Durga and Mahishasura. The tenth day is the day when Durga finally defeated him. For other Hindus, this festival symbolizes the victory of Rama over Ravana as recounted in the Ramayana.

In Nepal all Hindu ethnic groups celebrate this festival with their own variation. Among the Newars, it is known as Swanti. The festival is celebrated from Trayodashi of Kartik Krishna to Kartik Shukla Dwitiya every year.  Tihar in general signifies the festival of lights, where diyas are lit both inside and outside the houses to make it illuminate at night. The five-day festival is considered to be of great importance as it shows reverence to not just the humans and the Gods, but also to the animals like crow, cow and dog, who maintain an intense relationship with the humans. People make patterns on the floor of living rooms or courtyards using materials such as colored rice, dry flour, colored sand or flower petals outside of their house, called "Rangoli" which is meant to be sacred welcoming areas for the Hindu deities.
During the celebrations gamblers are found in the streets and some gamblers are known to make extreme bets such as staking their properties and some times their own daughter and wives jewelries.

Tihar
Tihar (Nepali: तिहार; also known as Deepawali and Yamapanchak or Swanti (Newar: स्वन्ती:)), is a five-day Hindu festival celebrated in Nepal. Tihar is analogous to the Indian festival of Diwali, the festival of lights, but with some significant differences. Like with Diwali, Tihar is marked by lighting diyas inside and outside the home but unlike the Indian festival, the five days of Tihar include celebration and worship of the four creatures associated with the Hindu god of death Yama, with the final day reserved for people themselves. According to the Vikram Samvat calendar, the festival begins with Kaag (crow) Tihar on Trayodashi of Kartik Krishna Paksha (the 13th day of the waning moon) and ends with Bhai (brother) Tika on Dwitiya of Kartik Sukla Paksha every year. In the Gregorian calendar, the festival falls sometime between October and November every year. In the year 2021, Tihar begins on 3 November 2021 and ends on 21 November 2021..

Bhai Tika 
On the fifth day of Yamapanchak, as part of the Tihar Festival, men visit the house of their sister's, where sister put a tika or mark on his forehead and a garland around his neck. Sisters pray for long and prosperous life of their brothers. The men then touches the feet of their sisters and whereby grand meal (Sel roti, sweetmeats and other eatable things to eat) is served by sisters to brothers in their house . In return she receives a gift of money, clothes or ornaments etc.

Other festivals

Chhath 

In context of Nepal, Chhath (Nepali: छठ, छठी, छठ
पर्व, छठ पुजा, डाला छठ, डाला पुजा,
सुर्य षष्ठी) is a festival of the Terai and Mithila region of Nepal celebrated by the Nepalese people of Tharus, indigenous Maithils and Madhesi ethnic groups in all the major parts of Nepal including Kathmandu, the capital city of the country. In modern days, Chhath is even celebrated in hills by the Pahari people. The government of Nepal declares the Public holidays all over Nepal during the Chhath festivals.  It is a Hindu festival dedicated to the Hindu Sun God, Surya and Chhathi Maiya (ancient Vedic Goddess Usha). The Chhath Puja is performed in order to thank Surya for sustaining life on earth and to request the granting of certain wishes.

The Sun, considered the god of energy and of the life-force, is worshiped during the Chhath festival to promote well-being, prosperity and progress. In Hinduism, Sun worship is believed to help cure a variety of diseases, including leprosy, and helps ensure the longevity and prosperity of family members, friends, and elders. The rituals of the festival are rigorous and are observed over a period of four days. They include holy bathing, fasting and abstaining from drinking water (Vratta), standing in water for long periods of time, and offering prashad (prayer offerings) and arghya to the setting and rising sun.

Biska Jatra

Biska Jatra (Biska Jatra) is an annually celebrated festival of Bhaktapur celebrated in the new year of Bikram Sambat. Different idols of gods and goddesses are placed in their chariot called "kha" and are taken to different parts of Bhaktapur. It is the second biggest festival of the people of Bhaktapur after Dashain. It is celebrated for more than a week in Bhaktapur. Grand feasts are organized in different parts of Bhaktapur. Similarly, in Madhyapur Thimi (a part of Bhaktapur) people celebrate this festival by smearing colors in each others. Another part of Thimi named Bode celebrates this festival with tongue-piercing of the resident belonging to a Shrestha family. Biska Jatra is also celebrated in places like Dhulikhel, Khadpu, Sanga and Tokha.

Bajra Jogini Jatra 

Bajra Jogini was originally celebrated by Buddhists but is also celebrated by Hindus on the 3rd of Baisakh. Her temple, Kharg Jogini, is found at Manichur mountain, near Sankhu. During the week-long festival, a fire is burned in the vicinity of the temple near an image of a human head. An image of the goddess is placed in a  khat (a wooden shrine) and carried through the town by the men.

Siti Jatra

The Siti Jatra takes place on the 21st of Jeth, on the banks of the  Bisnumati, between Kathmandu and Swoyambhunath. The people feast and afterwards divide into two teams to contest a stone throwing competition. The match was once a serious affair and anybody who was knocked down or captured by the other party was sacrificed to the goddess Kankeshwari. In modern times, however. it is a light hearted affair, mostly among the children.

Gatha Mu Ga: or Ghanta Karn

This festival refers to the celebration of the expulsion of a Rakshasa or demon from the country, held on the 14th of Sawan. The Newars make a straw figure which they beat and drag around the streets. The figures are burned at sunset.

Pancha Dan

The festival is celebrated twice a year, on the 8th of Sawan and the 13th of Bhadon. The Banras, priests of the Newar Buddhists visit each house and receive a small offering of grain or rice to commemorate their ancestors who were not permitted to trade. The Newars decorate their shops and houses with pictures and flowers and the women sit with large baskets of rice and grain to dispense to the Banras. it is celebrated at late night.

Janai Purnima
The Janai Purnima also known as Rakshyabandhan festival takes place on the full moon day of Shrawan i.e. Shrawan Purnima every year. In the year of 2071, it was on 25th Shrawan and in 2072 its on 12th of Bhadra.  It is celebrated by Hindus and other Hindu related religions like Buddhist, Jain,  belonging to aumkaar (ॐ कार) family.  The Buddhist bath in sacred streams and visit their temples and the Brahman priests offer an ornamental thread to the wrists of their followers and in return receive gifts. Many pilgrims visit Gosainkunda and bath at the sacred lake. Mainly the people of Brahmin and chettri community change the sacred around their neck.

Nag Panchami

Nag Panchami takes place on the 5th of Shrawan to commemorate the battle between Nag and Garur. The stone image of Garur at Changu Narayan is said to perspire during the festival and priests are sent to wipe the perspiration off with a handkerchief. They later present it to the king and water is used to make it into a snake bite remedy, despite the fact that there are few snakes inhabiting Nepal. There is a belief that nag panchami is the day of welcoming the other festivals in the Nepal.

Krishna Janmashtami

Krishna Janmashtami is celebrated on the 8th of Bhadon, in memory of Lord Krishna. Shops and houses are adorned in celebration.

Losar
Losar or Lochhar is the festival celebrated by Tamang, Gurung, Sherpa and other Himalayan communities of Nepal. Sonam Lhosar is celebrated by the Tamangs, Gyalpo Lhosar by the Sherpas and Tamu Lhosar is celebrated by the Gurungs.

Gai Jatra/Saa: Paru

Gai Jatra is a Newar festival held in the month of Bhadra. Newars who have lost loved ones during the year traditionally disguised themselves as cows and danced around the palace of the king. However, in modern times, the ceremony is performed only as a masked dance with the singing of songs. Gaijatra, the festival of cows, (gai means cow and jatra means festival in Nepali: गाईजात्रा, and Nepal Bhasa: सापारु) is celebrated in Nepal, mainly in Kathmandu valley by the Newars. It is also a grand festival in Jumla, celebrated by people of all caste . The festival commemorates the death of people during the year. During the festival, cows are marched in the streets and generally celebrated in the Nepalese month of Bhadra (August–September).

It falls on the 1st day of the dark fortnight of Gunla according to the lunar Nepal Era calendar. Peoples also distributes food to others. The festival of cows is one of the most popular festivals of Nepal.
The whole complex of Gaijatra festival has its roots in the ancient ages when people feared and worshiped Yamaraj, the god of death. However, the ironic sessions synonymous with the Gaijatra festival entered the tradition in the medieval period of Nepal during the reign of the Malla Kings. Hence, the present form of Gaijatra is a happy blending of antiquity and the medieval era.
According to the traditions since time immemorial, every family who has lost one relative during the past year must participate in a procession through the streets of Kathmandu leading a cow. If a cow is unavailable then a young boy dressed as a cow is considered a fair substitute.

In Hinduism, a cow is regarded as the most venerated among all the domestic animals. It is believed that the cow, revered as a holy animal by Hindus, will help the deceased relative's journey to heaven.
According to the historical evidence, when King Pratap Malla lost his son, his wife, the queen, remained grief-stricken. The king was very sad to see the condition of his beloved queen. The king, in spite of several efforts, could not lessen the grief of his wife. He desperately wanted to see a little smile on the lips of his sweetheart, and so he announced that anyone who made the queen laugh would be rewarded adequately.

During the festival of Gaijatra, the cow procession was brought before the grief-stricken queen. Then the participants began ridiculing and be-fooling the important people of the society. Finally, when the social injustices and other evils were highlighted and attacked mercilessly, the queen could not help but smile. The queen laughed and the king instituted a tradition of including jokes, satire, mockery and lampoon into the Gaijatra celebration.

After the procession is over, in the afternoon, nearly everyone takes part in another age-old tradition in which the participants dress up and wear masks. The occasion is filled with songs and jokes. Mockery and humor of every kind become the order of the day until late evening. Hence, Gaijatra is a healthy festival which enables the people to accept the reality of death and to prepare themselves for life after death. According to Hinduism, "whatever a man does in his life is a preparation leading to a good life after death".

Bagh Jatra 
This festival takes place on the 2nd of Bhadon. Dancers once dressed up in tiger costumes but today it is merely a repetition of the Gai Jatra festival.

Indra Jatra
The Indra Jatra festival begins on the 26th of Bhadon and lasts for eight days. This festival is held in early to mid September and marks the end of the rainy season.  On the first day a lofty wooden post is erected before the king's palace or at other Darbur sites and dancers from all across Nepal perform with masks. If an earthquake ever occurred on the opening day of the festival this was considered a bad omen and the festival would have to be restarted.

On the third day, young virgins are brought before the king and worshiped and then carried through Kathmandu, mounted on oars. The highlight is parading the Kumari Devi (living god) through Kathmandu on a special chariot built just this purpose.  The chariots are parked outside the Kumar Devi's house at the Kathmandu Durbar Square.

Mohani

Mohani corresponds to Dasain and is one of the year's grandest celebrations for the Newars. The event involves family gatherings and outdoor functions, and lasts 10 days.

Bala Chaturdasi or Satbyu

This festival takes places on the 14th of Aghan, when people gather in the forest of Mrigasthali, near the temple of Pashupati to scatter an offering of rice, vegetables and sweetmeats.

Kartik Purnima

 
On the first day of the month of Kartik, many women go to the temple of Pashupati. There they remain for an entire month, fasting and drinking only water. Some women have died during the fasting but the majority generally survive and on the last day of the month, known as the purnima, the night is spent rejoicing the success of the fasting by singing and dancing into the night.

Ganesh Chauthi

The Ganesh Chauthi festival is held on the 4th of Magh, in honor of Lord Ganesh, the god of wisdom. The day is spent fasting and worshipping and in ended by feasting into the night.

Maghe Sankranti

Maghe sankranti is observed in the month of January on the first day of the month of Magh, bringing an end to the ill-omened month of Poush when all religious ceremonies are forbidden. On this day, the sun leaves its southernmost position and takes off for its northward journey, so Maghe Sankranti is similar to solstice festivals in many other traditions. People participate in holy bathing in this festival and auspicious foods like laddoo, ghee, sweet potatoes etc. are distributed. The mother of the house wishes good health to all family members.

According to Mahabharata, king Bhishma, who had the power to control his own death, happened to choose to die on the day of Maghe Sakranti. Therefore, it is believed that to die on this day might achieve Moksha, a release from the rebirth cycle.

Basantpanchami or Sri Panchami

This festival takes place in the  month of Magh or Phalgun  in the honor of Goddess Saraswati, the goddess of learning.

Holi

The festival takes place on the last day of Fhalguna. In Nepal, a wooden post, known as a chir is adorned with flags and erected in front of the palace. It is burned at night, representing the burning of the body of the old year.

Maghe Purnima

The bathing festival where Newars bathe in the Bagmati River. during Magh. On the last day of the month, bathers are carried in a procession in ornamented dolis, lying on their backs with lighted lamps (known as chirags) on their chests, arms and legs. Other bathers bear earthen water pots on their heads, perforated with straws, through which water seeps down to sprinkle passers by. Traditionally the bathers wear green spectacles to protect their eyes from the sparks of the lamps they are in contact with.

Pāhān Charhe

During Pahan Charhe which is one of the festivals in Kathmandu, Luku Māhādev (meaning Mahadev enshrined in the ground) is worshipped and portable shrines containing images of mother goddesses are paraded through the streets.

Ghode Jatra

Traditionally on the 15th of Chait, all horses and ponies belonging to government servants were assembled at the grand parade ground and entered into a race in front of the king and top officials who are stationed around a central monument. The monument bore Sir Jung Bahadur's statue. After the event, gambling is allowed for two days and nights and the festival ends with an illumination of the monument. In 1875, Bahadur's statue and four dragon monuments were moved into a newly built temple in his honor, hence the location of the festival moved.

Jana Bāhā Dyah Jātrā

Jana Bāhā Dyah Jātrā is the chariot procession of Jana Baha Dyah, the Bodhisattva of compassion, which is held annually in Kathmandu. During the festival, the image of Jana Bāhā Dyah is removed from his temple at Jana Baha and installed in a car built in the shape of a tower on wheels. The chariot is drawn through the center of Kathmandu for three days.

Bunga Dyah Jātrā

An image of Bunga Dyah (Rato Machhendranath) is placed on a tall chariot which is pulled in stages through the streets of Patan for a month in the longest chariot procession held in the country.

Christmas 
Christmas is celebrated by the Christian community in Nepal.

Eid al-Fitr 
Eid al-Fitr is celebrated by the Muslim community in Nepal.

Chhechu 
Chhechu is a ceremony of the Tamang communities that takes place to the northwest of the Kathmandu Valley of Nepal over the course of ten days.  It contains sportive plays (tsema), exorcisms, and rituals. There are eleven tsema performed, and three exorcisms.

Yomari Punhi 
Yomari Punhi is a Newari festival marking the end of the rice harvest. It takes place in November/December during the full moon day of Thinlā, the second month in the lunar Nepal Era calendar.

Kirat Rai festivals 

 Sakela is the main Festival of Kirat Rais this festival is celebrated twice in a year as ubhauli in full moon day of the Baisakh and udhauli In full moon day of Mangsir
 Nwagi is celebrated during prior to eating the harvested food crops,
 Yele Sambat also known as "Yaledong" By  Rai People Maghe Sankranti also celebrate same day.  The Yele Sambat calendar is named after the first Kirat king Yalambar.
 Wadangmi Festival: Wadangmi is a Major Festival of Rai Community  Dhankuta District celebrated in the month of October/November

Limbu festivals
Some festivals may be practiced within ethnic groups in Nepal. Here are notable Limbu festivals:

 Chasok Tangnam - It is also known as udhauli too. It is also celebrated on mangsir's purnima.
 Kakphekwa Tangnam or Kusang Tangnam - It is celebrated on maghe sankranti as a new year of limbus.
 Sisekwa Tangnam - It is celebrated on Srawan's purnima.
 Balihang Tangnam - The Limbu version of the Tihar festival

Other festivals

See also

 Public holidays in Nepal
 National Paddy Day
 The Mahashivaraatri festival

References

External links
Major festivals of Nepal with pictures
Major festivals

 
Festivals
Nepal